Lepidopleurina is a suborder of polyplacophoran molluscs. It includes both extinct and extant species.

References 

Chitons
Mollusc suborders